Ravensworth is an unincorporated place and former railway point in the municipality of Kearney, Parry Sound District in Central Ontario, Canada. The community was once a station on the Ottawa, Arnprior and Parry Sound Railway, but it was decommissioned in 1959. The railbed was converted into Rain Lake Road to allow continued access to Ravensworth and other communities along the route.

History

Ravensworth was part of the township of Bethune until 1979, when the township was incorporated into Kearney. School and road taxes where payable directly to the Province of Ontario. Although there are modern-day homes and cottages in the area, no original buildings or landmarks remain today.

References

Other map sources:

Communities in Parry Sound District